Tillemans is a patronymic surname of Dutch origin from the personal name Til. Notable people with the surname include:

 Peter Tillemans ( 1684–1734), Flemish painter
 Tom Tillemans (born 1950), Dutch-Canadian Buddhologist, Indologist, and Tibetologist

See also 
 
 Tielemans
 Tilleman
 Tillemann

References 

Dutch-language surnames
Patronymic surnames